Captain Toad: Treasure Tracker is a 2014 action puzzle video game developed and published by Nintendo for the Wii U. It is a spin-off of the Super Mario series which builds upon the isometric minigames starring Captain Toad from Super Mario 3D World.

Enhanced ports were released for Nintendo 3DS and Nintendo Switch on July 13, 2018, including additional bonus levels themed around Super Mario Odyssey, but excluding the Super Mario 3D World bonus levels from the Wii U version. The Nintendo Switch port has sold over 1 million copies, making it one of the best-selling games on the system. A free update for the Nintendo Switch version was released on February 13, 2019, adding co-op multiplayer where another player controls a new purple Toad with white spots in the regular chapters alongside Toad/Toadette, and Toadette in the DLC Special Episode.

Paid downloadable content for the Nintendo Switch version of the game was released on March 14, 2019, adding a new 'Special Episode' featuring new courses. Certain courses were designed for the newly introduced co-op mode.

Gameplay

The game builds upon the "Adventures of Captain Toad" levels in Super Mario 3D World, where the basic gameplay model had first been introduced. In the game, players control Captain Toad, a Toad, and his companion Toadette, attempting to safely navigate through various obstacles and reach a gold star at the end of each level. Completing the original version allows players to see the link between Captain Toad: Treasure Tracker and Super Mario 3D World, and having save data from the latter or beating Treasure Tracker allows players to play four 3D World levels as Captain Toad. Meanwhile, the Switch version has an updated ending linked to Super Mario Odyssey as well as two-player co-op multiplayer, and scanning the Wedding Amiibo unlocks four bonus levels adapted from Odyssey. These levels can also be unlocked after completing Chapter 3.

The player can manipulate the camera to view levels and potentially reveal hidden areas containing bonus items. Both characters can be hit once before dying, but collecting mushrooms restores their health. As in Super Mario 3D World, Captain Toad and Toadette can walk and run, but cannot jump due to their heavy backpacks. As in Super Mario Bros. 2, they can pull up plants from the ground, granting the player coins or turnips to throw at enemies. They can also use the Super Pickax to clear out enemies and obstacle blocks, similar to the hammer in Donkey Kong. The game makes use of the Wii U GamePad's features, as the player can touch the screen to manipulate platforms, blow on the microphone to activate certain platforms, and use gyroscopic controls to aim turnips while riding mine carts. The game makes use of Amiibo: using the Toad Amiibo places a "pixel Toad" in levels for the player to find; other figurines give the player extra lives. In the Nintendo Switch/3DS ports, the hide-and-seek pixel toad challenges do not require a Toad Amiibo to play.

Plot

The game opens with Captain Toad and Toadette ascending a tower together to claim a Power Star. The villainous giant crow Wingo appears and steals the star, taking Toadette along with him when she grabs hold of it. The player guides Toad as he tracks Wingo down to his lair and rescues Toadette. In the second chapter of the story, the introductory scenario plays out again, but this time Toad is kidnapped and the player assumes control of Toadette. After Toad is rescued and Wingo reemerges again, Toadette is kidnapped again and Toad is knocked off of Wingo's tower. Then, the third chapter of the story begins, in which both Toad and Toadette venture through levels on their way to the showdown with Wingo, along the way defeating Draggadon, the king of Pyropuff Peak, for the third time. In the final scene of the game, the introduction to Super Mario 3D World plays out, and Captain Toad is seen following a falling Green Star into the glass pipe. For the Switch/3DS versions, the final scene shows Captain Toad following the Odyssey.

Development
Early in the development of Super Mario 3D World, Nintendo created prototypes of various gameplay ideas, including what IGN described as small "diorama-like levels the player could twist and turn." However, when the team added a character who could jump, they realized the levels would have to increase in size. They decided to keep the small-scale course design by eliminating jumping entirely, which also forced them to choose a player character other than Mario or Luigi. Director Shinya Hiratake suggested that Shigeru Miyamoto make Link from The Legend of Zelda a playable character, but Miyamoto instructed him to choose a different one. The developers then realized that Captain Toad, a background character from the Super Mario Galaxy games, would fit the role due to his heavy backpack, which they reasoned would weigh too much and keep him from jumping. Originally, the team thought the levels could form their own game, but instead a few were included in Super Mario 3D World. After 3D World was finished in late 2013, Miyamoto found that the Captain Toad levels reminded him of one of his earlier gameplay ideas inspired by the Rubik's Cube, so he suggested they create a separate Captain Toad game. The game also had developmental assistance from 1-Up Studio.

Reception

Treasure Tracker was well-received upon reveal at E3 2014. Calling it "the best Nintendo spin-off in years", Eurogamer described the game as the lead character's "proper introduction" and "the fully-realised experience that his earlier debut [in Super Mario 3D World] deserved." Polygon declared that the game "will make you fall in love with the mine cart level", comparing some levels to a "Super Mario desert environment," and others to a "Luigi's Mansion-style ghost house."

The game received a positive reception, according to review aggregator Metacritic. Marty Sliva of IGN stated he enjoyed the sense of discovery when looking around stages with the right-stick-controlled camera, exploring every area, and finding what he could interact with using the GamePad's touch screen. Sliva thought the variety of stages kept the game "feeling fresh" during his entire playthrough. However, he found that the use of the controller's gyroscope would cause the camera to "[spin] out of control whenever [he] moved [his] wrists," and that paging through the storybook-themed menus to find optional objectives is needlessly time-consuming. Giant Bomb's Dan Ryckert thought the game was "plenty of fun" and greatly appreciated the replay value when finding the three optional Super Gems in each level, but he found the ultimate goal in each stage repetitive and that, even at an MSRP two-thirds that of a full-priced game, "the offering [felt] a bit thin." He awarded the game three stars out of five. Hardcore Gamer's Dermot Creegan gave the game a 4.5/5, calling it a "delightful experience" and praising the level design, creativity and art direction. He criticized the forced gyroscope functionality, but was more praising of the other Wii U features saying they "succeed in bringing a dash of extra variety and creativity from time to time." Nintendo World Report's Curtis Bonds liked the "very tricky and clever level design" and thought that finding all the collectibles in each level was "extremely satisfying." While the game made "clever" use of the GamePad, he found the gyroscopic camera controls "annoying" and was disappointed by the game's spartan menus in addition to assets recycled from Super Mario 3D World.

Sales
Approximately 250,000 copies were sold during its first month in the United States. In Japan, roughly 155,000 copies of the game had been sold by the end of June 2015. The Switch and 3DS ports of the game sold 108,698 and 42,818 physical copies respectively during their first two months on sale in Japan. As of March 2019, the Switch port has sold 240,000 copies in Japan, and 1.18 million copies worldwide, making it one of the best-selling games on the system.

The 2021 CESA Games White Papers revealed that the Wii U version has sold a total of 1.37 million units, as of December 2020. It also revealed that the Switch version has sold a total of 1.77 million units, as of December 2020.

The 2022 CESA Games White Papers revealed that the Switch version of the game have sold 2.13 million copies as of December 2021.

Accolades
The game was nominated for "Best Puzzle/Adventure" and "Best Wii U Exclusive" at GameTrailers' Best of 2014 Awards. In addition, it won the People's Choice Award for "Best Puzzle Game" at IGN's Best of 2014 Awards, whereas its other nomination was for "Best Wii U Game". The 3DS and Switch versions were nominated for "Nintendo Game of the Year" at the 2018 Golden Joystick Awards, and for "Game, Franchise Family" at the 2019 National Academy of Video Game Trade Reviewers Awards.

Notes

References

External links
 

2014 video games
Mario puzzle games
Nintendo 3DS games
Nintendo Switch games
Puzzle video games
Single-player video games
Video game prequels
Video games developed in Japan
Video games that use Amiibo figurines
Wii U games
Wii U eShop games
Video games scored by Mahito Yokota
Video games scored by Naoto Kubo
Video games with downloadable content